The 1922 Boston University football team was an American football team that represented Boston University as an independent during the 1922 college football season. In its second season under head coach Charles Whelan, the team compiled a 2–4–3 record and was outscored by a total of 76 to 63.

Schedule

References

Boston University
Boston University Terriers football seasons
Boston University football